Gaavillingili as a place name may refer to two places in the Republic of Maldives:
 Gaavillingili (Baa Atoll)
 Gaavillingili (Raa Atoll)